"" ("The Shopkeeper's Mirror"), Op. 66, is a 1918 song cycle of 12 songs written by Richard Strauss. The songs were set to texts commissioned by Strauss in a piqued response to a contractual obligation to produce a set of songs for his publisher. The texts were provided by Berlin literary critic Alfred Kerr, who wrote for Strauss a set of acidic verses ridiculing the music publishing business and containing in-jokes attacking some of Strauss' enemies such as Bote & Bock. The list of titles is:

The cycle is rarely performed today due to the arcane texts, but contains virtuoso music for the pianist.

References

Song cycles by Richard Strauss
1921 compositions